Brenda Kay Sannes (born August 24, 1958) is an American lawyer who serves as the Chief United States district judge of the United States District Court for the Northern District of New York. She is a former assistant United States attorney who served from 1988 to 2014.

Biography

Sannes received a Bachelor of Arts degree, magna cum laude, in 1980 from Carleton College. She received a Juris Doctor in 1983 from the University of Wisconsin Law School. She served as a law clerk to Judge Joseph Jerome Farris of the United States Court of Appeals for the Ninth Circuit, from 1983 to 1984. From 1984 to 1988, she worked at the law firm of Wyman, Bautzer, Christensen, Kuchel & Silbert in Los Angeles, California. She served as an assistant United States attorney for the Central District of California, from 1988 to 1994, later serving a two-year detail in that office from 2003 to 2005. From 1995 to 2014, she served as an assistant United States attorney in the Northern District of New York, serving as Chief of the Appellate Section from 2005 to 2014.

Federal judicial service

On May 8, 2014, President Barack Obama nominated Sannes to serve as a United States District Judge of the United States District Court for the Northern District of New York, to the seat vacated by Judge Norman A. Mordue, who assumed senior status on June 30, 2013. She received a hearing on her nomination on Tuesday, June 24, 2014. On July 17, 2014 her nomination was reported out of committee by a voice vote. On November 18, 2014 Senate Majority Leader Harry Reid filed for cloture on her nomination. On Wednesday November 19, 2014 cloture was invoked by a 55–42 vote. On Thursday, November 20, 2014 the Senate voted 96–0 in favor of final confirmation. She received her judicial commission on November 21, 2014. Sannes became chief judge on August 31, 2022.

References

External links

1958 births
Living people
21st-century American judges
21st-century American women judges
American women lawyers
Assistant United States Attorneys
California lawyers
Carleton College alumni
Judges of the United States District Court for the Northern District of New York
New York (state) lawyers
Politicians from Billings, Montana
United States district court judges appointed by Barack Obama
University of Wisconsin Law School alumni